Kosa, Kósa, or Kóša are surnames with multiple origins. Notable people with the surname include:

 Ádám Kósa (born 1975), Hungarian politician
 Emil Kosa Jr. (1903–1968), American artist
 Ferenc Kósa (1937–2018), Hungarian filmmaker
 Gábor Kósa (born 1971), Hungarian historian
 György Kósa (1897–1984), Hungarian composer
 Lajos Kósa (born 1964), Hungarian politician
 Muchaki Kosa, Indian politician
 Sebastian Kóša (born 2003), Slovak footballer

See also
 

Hungarian-language surnames